Alica Schmidt (born 8 November 1998) is a German runner. She was part of the national team that came second in the 4 × 400 metres relay event at the 2017 European Athletics U20 Championships, and third in the same discipline at the 2019 European Athletics U23 Championships. She was previously a fitness coach of Bundesliga club Borussia Dortmund. Schmidt was part of the German relay squad at the 2020 Summer Olympics, though she did not compete.

Early life
Schmidt was born in 1998 in Worms, Germany. Her family now lives in Ingolstadt, Bavaria, Germany. She attended Fresenius University of Applied Sciences.

Career
Schmidt started competing in the 200 metres, 400 metres, and 800 metres running events. In 2018, she started competing in 400 metres hurdles events. Schmidt began her career training at MTV Ingolstadt.

In 2017, Schmidt came second in the 200 metres event at the under-20s German Championship. At the 2017 European Athletics U20 Championships, Schmidt was part of the German 4 × 400 metres relay team that finished second, alongside Vanessa Aniteye, Meike Gerlach and Corinna Schwab. Their time of 03:33:08 was faster than the previous age group world record, but they finished behind the Ukrainian team, who set the new world record. It was the first medal at the Championships for an Ingolstadt athlete since 1999. Schmidt also set a personal best time of 54.23 seconds in a qualifying round of the individual 400 metres event at the Championships. She was withdrawn from the individual 400 metres final in order to focus on the relay event. In the same year, she came second at the German under-20 Championship in the 400 metres event.

Ahead of the 2019 season, Schmidt joined SCC Berlin. She was part of the German team that came third in the 4 × 400 metres relay event at the 2019 European Athletics U23 Championships. At the 2019 German Athletics Championships, Schmidt came third in the under-23s 400 metres event, and was part of the SCC Berlin team that came second in the 4 × 400 metres relay event. During the COVID-19 pandemic lockdowns, Schmidt trained alone, and ran through forests.

Schmidt was appointed as Borussia Dortmund's fitness coach for the 2020–21 Bundesliga season.

Schmidt was in the German squad for the 4 × 400 metres relay event at the 2021 European Athletics Indoor Championships. Schmidt was selected for the German relay squad at the delayed 2020 Summer Olympics; she travelled to the games as a substitute in the mixed relay, in which she did not run. She came second in the 400 metres event at the 2022 German Indoor Athletics Championships, behind Corinna Schwab. Schmidt chose not to compete at the 2022 World Athletics Indoor Championships, in order to focus on her outdoor season. Schmidt was part of the German team that finished sixth in the final of the 4 × 400 metres relay event at the 2022 European Athletics Championships.

Public image
In 2017, Australian magazine Busted Coverage described Schmidt as "the world's sexiest athlete". After hearing of this, Schmidt said: "I do not know why I got this title. Sport clearly comes first." She attributed this for an increase in her social media followers; in 2018, she had 208,000 Instagram followers, in 2020, she had 745,000 followers, and in 2021, she had over 2 million followers on the platform. Schmidt is sponsored by Puma.

References

External links

1998 births
Living people
German female sprinters
People from Worms, Germany
Borussia Dortmund non-playing staff
Association football coaches
Sportspeople from Rhineland-Palatinate